Gerrit "Gerrie" Slot (born 23 May 1954) is a retired amateur Dutch track cyclist who was active between 1973 and 1980. He competed at the 1976 Summer Olympics in the 4 km team time trial and finished in fifth place. In 1979 he won the national title in the point race.

See also
 List of Dutch Olympic cyclists

References

1954 births
Living people
Olympic cyclists of the Netherlands
Cyclists at the 1976 Summer Olympics
Dutch male cyclists
Sportspeople from Alkmaar
Dutch cyclists at the UCI Track Cycling World Championships
Cyclists from North Holland